Merton Elmer Lewis (December 10, 1861 – May 2, 1937) was an American lawyer and politician who served as the 51st Attorney General of New York state.

Life
He was born on December 10, 1861, in Webster, Monroe County, New York, the son of Charles Chadwick Lewis (b. 1826) and Rhoda Ann (Willard) Lewis. He graduated from Webster Union School, then studied law with James B. Perkins at Rochester. He was admitted to the bar in 1887, and commenced practice in Rochester. On January 2, 1886, he married Adeline Louise Moody (1866-1894).

He was delegate to the New York State Constitutional Convention of 1894. He was an alderman of Rochester from 1891 on, and became President of the Common Council in 1894. He was elevated to Acting Mayor of Rochester after the resignation of George W. Aldridge on January 22, 1895. Lewis worked closely with Aldridge, and opponents of Aldridge's machine organized a Good Government League to make local elections non-partisan. Lewis did not run in the 1895 mayoral election and focused on election to the state legislature after stepping down.

He was a member of the New York State Assembly (Monroe Co., 1st D.) in 1897, 1899, 1900 and 1901; and of the New York State Senate (43rd D.) from 1902 to 1906, sitting in the 125th, 126th, 127th, 128th and 129th New York State Legislatures.

At the New York state election, 1906, he ran for New York State Comptroller, but except for Governor Charles Evans Hughes, the whole Republican ticket was narrowly defeated by the ticket nominated by the Democratic Party and the Independence League.

In January 1915, he was appointed as First Deputy by Attorney General Egburt E. Woodbury. Woodbury resigned on April 19, 1917, and six days later Lewis was elected New York Attorney General by joint ballot of the New York State Legislature, with Lewis receiving all 173 votes of the Democrats and Republicans in the legislature, and Morris Hillquit receiving 2 votes from the Socialist members. He remained in office for the remainder of Woodbury's term, which ended in 1918.

In 1918, he declined to run for re-election and ran in the Republican primary for governor instead, with the support of Aldridge's machine in Rochester. In August 1918, he urged the Republican voters to repudiate his opponent, the incumbent Governor Charles S. Whitman, because Whitman was backed by William Randolph Hearst whom he accused of having undermined the United States war effort against Germany. Whitman was re-nominated but was defeated in the election by Al Smith.

He died on May 2, 1937, in Rochester, New York.

References

1861 births
1937 deaths
New York State Attorneys General
Mayors of Rochester, New York
Republican Party members of the New York State Assembly